Corddry is a surname. Notable people with the surname include:

Nate Corddry (born 1977), American actor and comedian
Rob Corddry (born 1971), American actor and comedian, brother of Nate

See also
Cordray
Corday